The Old Citrus County Courthouse (constructed in 1912) is a historic site in Inverness, Florida located at 1 Courthouse Square. On April 17, 1992, it was added to the U.S. National Register of Historic Places. The building was designed by J. R. MacEachron and Willis R. Biggers.

The Old Courthouse Heritage Museum opened in the building in 2000, and is operated by the Citrus County Historical Society.  Exhibits focus on local county history.

The second floor of the courthouse was restored to its original appearance in 2000.  In 1961, scenes from the movie Follow That Dream, starring Elvis Presley, were filmed in the courtroom.

References

 Florida's Historic Courthouses by Hampton Dunn

External links
 Old Courthouse Heritage Museum - Citrus County Historical Society
 Florida's Office of Cultural and Historical Programs
 Citrus County listings
 Citrus County markers

Buildings and structures in Citrus County, Florida
County courthouses in Florida
Courthouses on the National Register of Historic Places in Florida
Museums in Citrus County, Florida
History museums in Florida
Clock towers in Florida
National Register of Historic Places in Citrus County, Florida
1912 establishments in Florida
Government buildings completed in 1912